A modifier letter, in the Unicode Standard, is a letter or symbol typically written next to another letter that it modifies in some way. They generally function like diacritics, changing the sound-values of the letter it is next to (usually the letter preceding it but sometimes the following letter instead). Like combining marks, they are often used in technical phonetic transcriptional systems to make phonetic distinctions.

References 

Unicode